Tatyana Pavlova (10 December 1890 – 7 November 1975) was a Russian-born theatre director and stage and film actress who settled in Italy. Her name is sometimes written as Tatania Pavlova.

Selected filmography
 Everybody's Woman (1934)
 Creatures of the Night (1934)
 Black Magic (1949)
 The Dreamer (1965)

References

Bibliography
 Cardullo, Bert. Vittorio De Sica: Actor, Director, Auteur. Cambridge Scholars Publishing, 2009.

External links

1890 births
1975 deaths
Russian stage actresses
Russian film actresses
Russian silent film actresses
Emigrants from the Russian Empire to Italy
Italian stage actresses
Italian film actresses
Actors from Dnipro